Stipularia may refer to:
 Stipularia (plant), a genus of plants in the family Rubiaceae
 Stipularia, a genus of plants in the family Caryophyllaceae, synonym of Spergularia
 Stipularia, a genus of plants in the family Ranunculaceae, synonym of Thalictrum